The 2013 NCAA Division I Men's Lacrosse Championship was the 43rd annual single-elimination tournament to determine the national championship for National Collegiate Athletic Association (NCAA) Division I men's college lacrosse. Sixteen teams were selected to compete in the tournament based upon their performance during the regular season, and for some, by means of a conference tournament automatic qualifier. The Divisions I men’s lacrosse committees announced the matchups (16 teams, eight games) on 5 May 2013. Duke defeated Loyola, Notre Dame, Cornell, and Syracuse to capture to their second NCAA Championship.

Tournament overview
The tournament started on May 11  and ended on May 27 with the championship game at Lincoln Financial Field in Philadelphia, Pennsylvania.

Schools from eight conferences, America East, Big East, Colonial Athletic Association (CAA), ECAC Lacrosse League (ECAC), Ivy League, Metro Atlantic Athletic Conference (MAAC), Northeast Conference (NEC), and Patriot League, earned automatic bids into the tournament by winning their respective conference tournaments, leaving eight remaining at-large bids for top ranked teams. Albany (America East), Syracuse (Big East), Towson (CAA), Ohio State (ECAC), Yale (Ivy), Detroit Mercy (MAAC), Bryant (NEC), and Lehigh (Patriot) received automatic bids.

Teams

Tournament bracket

 † = Double Overtime

Returning All-Americans in the NCAA tournament
There are thirteen players on the top five teams in division I men's lacrosse (North Carolina, Cornell, Denver, Loyola (Md.) and Syracuse) that were All-Americans in the 2012 season.  The only player on one of the top five teams that was a first-team All American in 2012 is RG Keenan from North Carolina. Cornell attackman Rob Pannell was a first-team All American in 2010 and 2011, but missed most of the 2012 season due to a broken foot.

Tewaaraton Award nominees in NCAA tournament
There are eight players on the top five teams in division I men's lacrosse (North Carolina, Cornell, Denver, Loyola (Md.) and Syracuse) that were nominees for the annual Tewaaraton award given to the best college lacrosse player.

Major League Lacrosse players (drafted) in NCAA tournament
Major League Lacrosse holds its draft in January each year and selects from collegiate players that are playing their final year of eligibility.

All-Tournament
 Brendan Fowler, M, Duke (Most Outstanding Player)
 Jordan Wolf, A, Duke
 David Lawson, M, Duke
 Jake Tripucka, M, Duke
 JoJo Marasco, A, Syracuse
 Sean Young, D, Syracuse
 Dylan Donahue, A, Syracuse
 Dominic LaMolinara, G, Syracuse
 Rob Pannell, A, Cornell
 Eric Law, A, Denver

References

External links
 Tournament statistics via NCAA

NCAA Division I Men's Lacrosse Championship
Sports in Philadelphia
NCAA Division I Men's Lacrosse Championship
NCAA Division I Men's Lacrosse Championship